Blind man's bluff may refer to:

Film and television
 Blind Man's Bluff (1936 film), a British film
 Blind Man's Bluff (1952 film), a 1952 British film directed by Charles Saunders
 "Blind Man's Bluff", an episode of the TV series All Grown Up!
 "Blind Man's Bluff", a season 5 episode of the TV series Little House on the Prairie
 "Blind Man's Bluff", the name of two different episodes of the TV series Gunsmoke, in season 8 (1963) and season 17 (1972)

Paintings
 Blind Man's Bluff (Fragonard, 1750)
 Blind Man's Buff (Fragonard, 1775–1780)
 Blind Man's Bluff (Goya), 1789

Other uses
 Blind man's bluff (poker), a version of poker
 Blind Man's Bluff: The Untold Story of American Submarine Espionage, a 1998 nonfiction book

See also
 Blind man's buff, a children's game related to tag